The Trail Blazers is a 1940 American Western "Three Mesquiteers" B-movie directed by George Sherman and starring Robert Livingston, Bob Steele, and Rufe Davis.

Cast
 Robert Livingston as Stony Brooke
 Bob Steele as Tucson Smith
 Rufe Davis as Lullaby Joslin
 Pauline Moore as Marcia Kelton
 Weldon Heyburn as Jeff Bradley
 Carroll Nye as Jim Chapman
 Tom Chatterton as Major R.C. Kelton
 Si Jenks as T.L. Johnson (dentist)
 Mary Field as Alice Chapman
 John Merton as Henchman Mason
 Rex Lease as Engineer Reynolds
 Robert Blair as Stage passenger
 Jack Kirk as Wagon Driver George

See also
Bob Steele filmography

References

External links
 

1940 films
1940 Western (genre) films
American Western (genre) films
1940s English-language films
American black-and-white films
Films directed by George Sherman
Republic Pictures films
Three Mesquiteers films
1940s American films